The 2014–15 season was Notts County Football Club's 126th year in the Football League and their 5th consecutive season in Football League One, the third division of the English League System.

Match Details

Pre-season

League One

League table

Matches
The fixtures for the 2014–15 season were announced on 18 June 2014 at 9am.

FA Cup

The draw for the first round of the FA Cup was made on 27 October 2014.

League Cup

The draw for the first round of the 2014–15 Football League Cup was made on 17 June 2014 at 10:00. Notts County were drawn away to Sheffield Wednesday and were eliminated from the competition after suffering a 3–0 defeat.

Football League Trophy

Transfers

In

Out

Loans In

Loans Out

References

Notts County F.C. seasons
Notts County